The Leslie West Band is the third album released by American rock guitarist Leslie West. The album, recorded at Electric Lady Studios in New York City, was released on Bud Prager's Phantom Records in 1976 and features Mick Jones, who formed Foreigner the following year, on guitar.

Track listing
All tracks composed by Leslie West, Corky Laing and Mick Jones; except where indicated
 "Money (Whatcha Gonna Do)"  3.40
 "Dear Prudence" (John Lennon, Paul McCartney)  4.44
 "Get It Up (No Bass - Whatsoever)"  2.58
 "Singapore Sling" (Mick Jones)  1.52
 "By The River"  2.50
 "The Twister"  2.25
 "Setting Sun"  3.42
 "Sea of Heartache"  3.33
 "We'll Find a Way" 3.15
 "We Gotta Get out of This Place" (Barry Mann, Cynthia Weil) 4.42

Personnel
The Leslie West Band
Leslie West – guitars, vocals
Corky Laing – drums
Mick Jones – guitar
Donald Kretmar – bass
Frank Vicari – horns
Sredni Vollmer – harp
Ken Ascher – piano
"Buffalo" Bill Gelber – bass
with:
Carl Hall – backing vocals
Tasha Thomas – backing vocals
Hilda Harris – backing vocals
Sharon Redd – backing vocals

Additional personnel
Bud Prager – executive producer
Bob D'Orleans – engineer
George Lopez – assistant engineer
John Thompson – cover art

References

1976 albums
Leslie West albums
Albums recorded at Electric Lady Studios